St. Petersburg-Ladozhsky, is the newest and most modern passenger railway station in Saint Petersburg, Russia, opened in 2003. It is the only major through station in the city, the other 4 are termini. It serves routes to the north and east previously served by Moskovsky railway station, as well as some lines previously served by Finland Station, Vitebsky station and Baltiysky station. Some trains originating in Moscow and bound for other cities via Saint Petersburg also use the station.

History

Initial plans for construction were formed at the end of the 1980s intended to replace Varshavsky station, but the project was shelved. Construction began on the station in 2001 and was completed in 2003. The new station, designed by architect Nikita Yavein, is one of the largest in Russia with a capacity of up to 50 commuter departures and 26 long distance departures accommodating 4,500 passengers per hour.

Built at a cost of nine billion rubles (USD 300 million), the station opened in 2003 for the 300th anniversary of the city's founding. President of Russia Vladimir Putin was on the opening the new station in his hometown.

External links 

 Article about station opening
 Official Site

Railway stations in Saint Petersburg
Railway stations in Russia opened in 2003